Joseph Anthony Phillips (30 December 1924 – 16 May 1969) was a New Zealand rugby union and professional rugby league footballer who played in the 1950s.

Playing career

Bradford Northern
Phillips played , and scored three conversions in Bradford Northern's 6-13 defeat by Wigan in the Championship Final during the 1951–52 season at Leeds Road, Huddersfield on Saturday 10 May 1952. He made 232 appearances for the club, scoring 47-tries and 661-goals.

Keighley
Phillips joined Keighley in 1957. He spent three seasons at the club, playing 80 games and scoring 20 tries and 225 goals.

International honours
Phillips represented Other Nationalities (RL) while at Bradford Northern, and represented Rugby League XIII (RL) while at Bradford Northern.

Post-playing career
In 1964, Phillips, along with former team-mate Trevor Foster, helped to lead a campaign which resulted in the reformation of Bradford Northern after the club folded a year earlier due to increasing financial difficulties. He later served as the club's chairman, and was also a director at Keighley.

Death and legacy
Phillips died on 16 May 1969 (the day before the 1968–69 Challenge Cup Final) in a hotel in London, aged 44, leaving a wife; Margaret C. (née Dixon) (marriage registered during first ¼ 1954 in Bradford district), and two children; Charles D. Phillips (birth registered during fourth ¼  in Bradford district), and Joseph Christian Phillips (birth registered during fourth ¼  in Bradford district). Later that year, Bradford named a trophy in his honour, the Joe Phillips Memorial Trophy, which is contested for between Phillips' former clubs, Bradford and Keighley.

References

External links
Photograph "Largest ever Northern Crowd - 14th March 1953 saw the largest ever crowd to watch a Bradford Northern game at Odsal when Huddersfield were the visitors in a third round Challenge Cup tie. Northern lost the tie 7-17. - 14/03/1953" at rlhp.co.uk
Photograph "Joe Phillips makes a break - Joe Phillips, the attacking Kiwi full back, who played for Bradford Northern between 1950 and 1956 amassing a massive 1,463 points including 661 goals. He once score 14 goals in a single game against Batley in 1952. - 01/01/1955" at rlhp.co.uk
Photograph "Trevor Foster receives his testimonial cheque - Trevor Foster receives his testimonial cheque with Joe Phillips - 03/08/1972 (sic)" at rlhp.co.uk
Search for "Joseph Phillips" at britishnewspaperarchive.co.uk
Search for "Joe Phillips" at britishnewspaperarchive.co.uk

1924 births
1969 deaths
Bradford Bulls players
Keighley Cougars players
New Zealand rugby league players
Other Nationalities rugby league team players
Place of birth missing
Rugby league fullbacks
Rugby League XIII players